The year 1785 in architecture involved some significant architectural events and new buildings.

Events
 May 20 – The United States Land Ordinance of 1785 determines the layout of townships in the western territories.
 July 17 – A groundbreaking ceremony is held for the Pella Palace in Russia, designed by Ivan Starov; it will never be completed.

Buildings and structures

Buildings completed

 May 19 – Plaza de Toros de Ronda, Spain.
 September 7 – Notre-Dame de Guebwiller inaugurated.
 Attingham Park, Shropshire, England, designed by George Steuart.
 Chertsey Bridge over the River Thames in England, designed by James Paine and Kenton Couse.
 Marble Palace in Saint Petersburg, Russia, designed by Antonio Rinaldi.
 Church of St. Stephen Harding in Apátistvánfalva.
 Odigitrievsky Cathedral in Ulan Ude, Russia.
 Palace of Iturbide in Mexico City, designed by Francisco Antonio de Guerrero y Torres.
 Grand Palace, Bangkok, completed.
 Rebuilding of Babolovo Palace in Tsarskoe Selo, Russia, by Ilya Neyelov.
 Modifications to Neue Kirche, Berlin, by Georg Christian Unger after a design by Carl von Gontard.
 Mussenden Temple on the north coast of Ireland.

Births
 October 29 – Achille Leclère, French architect (died 1853)
 William Cubitt, English civil engineer (died 1861)

Deaths
 August 11 – Marie-Joseph Peyre, French architect (born 1730)
 September 26 – Ventura Rodríguez, Spanish architect and artist (born 1717)

References

Architecture
Years in architecture
18th-century architecture